Hanni Mendes da Costa (née Schulte) is a retired West German slalom canoeist who competed in the mid-to-late 1950s. She won two silver medals in the folding K-1 team event at the ICF Canoe Slalom World Championships, earning them in 1955 and 1957.

References

West German female canoeists
Possibly living people
Year of birth missing (living people)
Medalists at the ICF Canoe Slalom World Championships